Neu Electrikk are a British experimental music group that were based in Croydon, England, and who formed in 1978.

Band history
Neu Electrikk stood apart from many of the synth dominated bands of that era. Their inventive approach touched on many different styles and genres, including, industrial music, post-punk, new wave. Neu Electrikks’ influences were the Velvet Underground, Neu!, David Bowie and John Cage.

The band consisted of Derek Morris (vocals, guitar, and lyrics), Steve Parry (guitars, electronics, keyboards, and other instruments), Steve James Sherlock (Saxophone, flute, other devices), Nick Chamberlain Hunt (bass), and Barry Deller (drums, percussion). Neu Electrikk released 2 single/eps on the Synethesia label - Lust of Berlin/Distractions (1979) and Cover Girl/Practically Isolate/Hand/Converse of Tapes (1980).

Having attracted a reasonable cult following on the London post-punk music circuit BBC Radio 1 DJ John Peel regularly featured them on his show. Stevo Pearce founder and manager of Some Bizzare Records discovered the band via an advert in Sounds magazine and contacted the band via their distributor Rough Trade Records. Stevo would play Neu Electrikk during his DJ/club nights and included their records in his Sounds magazine music chart. The version of "Lust of Berlin" on the Some Bizzare Album is a later recording made at ARK Studios, Kingston upon Thames.

Neu Electrikk gigged extensively, notably with the The at the Bridge house in Canning Town with Stevo as DJ. Live concerts were often erratic events consisting of long passages of improvisation, silence and noise. Neu Electrikk often took to the stage to the sound of a pre-recorded tape consisting of the voice of Frank Sinatra  accompanied by bird song and the sound of an industrial hammer.

Legacy

Further to Neu Electrikk disbanding, Steve Sherlock joined the The and joined Marc Almond in Marc and the Mambas, Nicholas Chamberlain Hunt continues to collaborate as a musician and producer on his Horizontal label, most noticeably with singer Christine Ann Leach (Baby Fox, William Orbit, co-writer of the song "Ray of Light", on projects ALF and Alongside Frank and the Acoustic Lounge Freaks. Steve Parry has released numerous recordings as a solo artist and as hwyl nofio (an avant-garde music ensemble of which Parry is the only permanent member).

References

External links
 Allmusic Allmusic
 discogs 
Some Bizzare records

English rock music groups
English new wave musical groups
English post-punk music groups
Musical groups established in 1978
1978 establishments in England